The 1987 AMCU-8 men's basketball tournament was held March 5–7, 1987, at the Hammons Student Center at Southwest Missouri State University in Springfield, Missouri.

SW Missouri State defeated  in the title game, 90–87, to win their first AMCU/Summit League championship. The Bears earned an automatic bid to the 1987 tournament.

Format
All eight conference members qualified for the tournament. First round seedings were based on regular season record.

Bracket

References

Summit League men's basketball tournament
1986–87 AMCU-8 men's basketball season
1987 in sports in Missouri